Life's So Funny is the sixth studio album by American country music artist Joe Diffie. It was released on December 5, 1995, through Epic Records. It contains the single "Bigger Than the Beatles", Diffie's last Number One single on the Billboard Hot Country Singles & Tracks (now Hot Country Songs) charts. Following this single were "C-O-U-N-T-R-Y" and "Whole Lotta Gone"; both peaked at #23. The track "Tears in the Rain" (co-written by Diffie) was originally recorded by Tim McGraw on his 1993 self-titled debut album.

Despite not being released as a single, the track "Down in a Ditch" received frequent airplay on KKBQ in Houston, Texas.

Track listing

Personnel
Lee Bogan – background vocals
Joe Diffie – lead vocals, background vocals
Stuart Duncan – fiddle, mandolin
Paul Franklin – steel guitar
Randy McCormick – piano, keyboards
Terry McMillan – percussion
Brent Mason – electric guitar
Steve Nathan – keyboards
Billy Joe Walker Jr. – acoustic guitar
Lonnie Wilson – drums, percussion
Glenn Worf – bass guitar

Strings by The Nashville String Machine arranged by Carl Gorodetzky.

Charts

Weekly charts

Year-end charts

References

1995 albums
Joe Diffie albums
Epic Records albums